John Newbold (14 December 1952 - 15 May 1982) was an English professional Grand Prix motorcycle road racer.

Newbold was born in Jacksdale, where his parents ran a butchers shop, and was brought up in South Normanton. He began riding motorcycles on grass when he was 15. He progressed from riding at Darley Moor on a bike loaned to him by John Cooper, to performing in front of 50,000 crowds at Silverstone Circuit.

His best season was in 1976 when he finished in fifth place in the 500cc world championship riding a Suzuki motorcycle. Newbold won his only world championship race in 1976 at the 500cc Czechoslovakian Grand Prix. He was a teammate of Barry Sheene and Mick Grant at Suzuki.

Newbold won the 1978 North West 200 race in Northern Ireland. He made his debut at the Isle of Man TT in 1981, finishing fourth and third. Also in 1981, Newbold was the top points scorer for Great Britain in the Transatlantic Trophy competition between British and American riders of the day. Newbold was killed after colliding with Mick Grant at the 1982 North West 200 in Coleraine.

References 

1952 births
1982 deaths
People from Jacksdale
Sportspeople from Nottinghamshire
English motorcycle racers
350cc World Championship riders
500cc World Championship riders
Isle of Man TT riders
Motorcycle racers who died while racing
Sport deaths in Northern Ireland
People from South Normanton
Sportspeople from Derbyshire